Lygodium japonicum is a species of fern that is known by the common names vine-like fern and Japanese climbing fern. It is native to eastern Asia, including Taiwan, Japan, Korea, southeastern Asia, and India, and eastern Australia. The fern is present in the southeastern United States and Puerto Rico as an introduced species.

Description
This fern produces a creeping stem from which grow very long leaves, the longest exceeding . The leaves have rachises, which are vine-like and may climb other vegetation. What appear to be individual leaves sprouting from the twining rachis are actually leaflets, which are smaller segments from the main leaf. There are two types of leaflets, sterile and fertile. The sterile frond has lance-shaped segments. The fertile frond has more intricately divided, fringed segments. It is lined with sporangia on the edges. The plant reproduces via spores and spreads vegetatively via underground rhizomes.

Cultivation
An introduced species in North America, Japanese climbing fern was first recorded as being established in Georgia in 1903. In the southeastern United States this plant is now considered an invasive weed of economic and ecological significance.

It grows in moist, swampy habitat, especially in disturbed areas. The presence of species such as the small-spike false nettle (Boehmeria cylindrica), royal fern (Osmunda spectabilis), resurrection fern (Pleopeltis polypodioides ssp. polypodioides), and toothed midsorus fern (Telmatoblechnum serrulatum) indicates the likely presence of this species. During controlled burns of wooded areas this fern may act as a "fuel ladder", which would allow the flames to climb into the canopy and destroy trees. After burns the fern can quickly grow back, so it cannot be controlled by fire.

Taxonomy
The specific epithet japonicum, refers to the Latin term for 'being from Japan'.

It was first published and described as Ophioglossaceae Ophioglossum japonicum Thunb. by Carl Peter Thunberg in Syst. Veg. edition 14 on page 926 in 1784, before Olof Swartz reclassified it as Lygodium japonicum in J. Bot. (edited by Schrader) on page 106 in 1802.

Invasiveness 
In Europe, Lygodium japonicum is included since 2019 in the list of Invasive Alien Species of Union concern (the Union list). This implies that this species cannot be imported, cultivated, transported, commercialized, planted, or intentionally released into the environment in the whole of the European Union.

References

External links

 Species Profile - Japanese Climbing Fern (Lygodium japonicum), National Invasive Species Information Center, United States National Agricultural Library. Lists general information and resources for Japanese Climbing Fern.

japonicum
Plants described in 1802
Flora of New South Wales
Flora of Taiwan
Flora of Japan
Ferns of India
Garden plants of Australia
Garden plants of Asia
Vines